Proline-rich protein PRCC is a protein that, in humans, is encoded by the PRCC gene.

In a subset of papillary renal cell carcinomas, a t(X;1)(p11;q21) chromosome translocation has been repeatedly reported and is thought to be the cause of the cancer. As a result of the translocation, the transcription factor TFE3 on the X chromosome becomes fused to this gene on chromosome 1. The fused gene results in the fusion of N-terminal proline-rich region of the protein encoded by this gene to the entire TFE3 protein. This protein has been shown to interact with the mitotic checkpoint protein MAD2B, which suggests that the dominant-negative effect of the fusion protein with TFE3 may lead to a mitotic checkpoint defect. Alternatively spliced transcript variants encoding distinct isoforms have been observed.

References

Further reading